Anders Aarum (born 17 December 1974 in Moss, Norway) is a Norwegian jazz pianist, known from numerous albums and international collaborations like Sonny Simmons, Ola Kvernberg, Tine Asmundsen, Sigurd Køhn, Børre Dalhaug, Nora Brockstedt and Even Kruse Skatrud.

Biography 
Aarum was educated at Agder Musikkonservatorium, Sibelius Academy in Helsinki, before he headed for Oslo in 1998. His jazz talent impressed the Oslo jazz community, and he was a popular collaborator within several bands, while he continued studying at Norges Musikkhøgskole and graduated with the thesis Stiltrekk som skiller den nordiske jazzen fra den afro-amerikanske.
He led his own Anders Aarum Trio to the debut album Lucky strike (2000) accompanied by Mats Eilertsen (bass) and Torstein Ellingsen (drums). It was followed up with Absence in mind (2004), where Ellingsen was replaced by Thomas Strønen. The third album of the Trio, First communion (2006), included Ole Morten Vågan (bass) and Andreas Bye (drums).

Aarum is also involved in FAQ (Fossum-Aarum Quartet) together with the brothers Håvard (saxophone and flute) and Jens Fossum (bass). The drummer Jarle Vespestad is the last but not least member of the crew. F.A.Q. was nominated for the 2007 Spellemannprisen in the class Jazz, for their debut album Frequently Asked Questions (2007). He is also regular pianist in the band Funky Butt. Otherwise, he has collaborated on releases with Per Høglend, Randi Tytingvåg, Sølvi Hansen, Ola Kvernberg, Majken Christiansen, Tine Asmundsen, Sigurd Køhn, Sonny Simmons, Børre Dalhaug, Hilde Louise Asbjørnsen, Jazzmob, Nora Brockstedt and Even Kruse Skatrud. Aarum was awarded the "No-fear Prize" by "Oslo Jazzradio", and is associated with Norges Musikkhøgskole as Lecturer in accompaniment.

Honors 
"No-fear" Award 2002 by "Oslo Jazzradio"

Discography

As band leader 
Within Anders Aarum Trio
 2000: Lucky strike (Hot Club)
 2004: Absence in Mind (Jazzaway)
 2006: First Communion (Jazzaway)
 2018 Shakin' Our Souls ((Ozella) http://www.ozellamusic.com/en/release/shakin-our-souls-4/
Within FAQ (Fossum-Aarum Quartet)
 2007: Frequently Asked Questions (Schmell), recorded in 2004

Collaborations
Within Funky Butt
 2001: Whoopin'  (Sonor)
 2002: The Glove (Sonor)
 2005: Big Mama (Schmell)
 2007: Shakin' da butt (Schmell)

Within Jazzmob
 2001: Pathfinder
 2006: Flashbackrecorded live at Moldejazz 2006

Within The Swing Pack
 2001: The Sinatra Songbook (Island)
 2003: Urban Breeze (Tylden & Co)

With Sonny Simmons
 2005: The Traveller (Jazzaway)
 2006: I'll See You When I Get There (Jazzaway)
 2007: Last Man Standing (Jazzaway)

With Hilde Louise Asbjørnsen
 2005: Birdie Blues (Upnorth Discs)
 2008: Sound Your Horn (Sweet Morning)
 2010: Never Ever Going Back (Sweet Morning)
 2011: Divin' at the Oceansound (Sweet Morning)

With other projects
 2001: Violin (Hot Club), with Ola Kvernberg
 2001: Song for My Father (Hot Club), with Majken Christiansen
 2003: aLive (Hazel Jazz), with Tine Asmundsen – recorded in 2002
 2003: Reporter (Hot Club), with Majken Christiansen live at Herr Nilsen Jazzclub
 2004: Bigbandblast! (Real), within Børre Dalhaug's "Bigbandblast"
 2005: This Place (Køhn), within Sigurd Køhn Quartet
 2005: Eveneven (Eveneven), within Even Kruse Skatrud's Eveneven Big Band
 2005: Christmas Songs (Køhn), with Nora Brockstedt
 2006: Midnight (EMI), with Bertine Zetlitz
 2006: Let Go (Mudi), with Randi Tytingsvåg
 2006: Edvard Grieg in Jazz mood (Universal), within Kjell Karlsen Big Band
 2008: My Letter to the World (Nordic), with Hanne Tveter – words by Emily Dickinson
 2009: Transformation to Paradise (Jazzaway), within Element – recorded in 2002
 2009: Stompin' Feet (Sweet Morning), with Julie Dahle Aagård
 2009: Warrior of Light (EmArcy), with Christina Bjordal
 2010: Bad Dreams And Good Nightmares (Sweet Morning), with Guro von Germeten

See also 

 List of jazz pianists

References

External links 
Anders Aarum at Jazzaway

20th-century Norwegian pianists
21st-century Norwegian pianists
Norwegian jazz pianists
Norwegian jazz composers
Male jazz composers
1974 births
Living people
Musicians from Moss, Norway
Hot Club Records artists
Jazzaway Records artists
Norwegian male pianists
20th-century Norwegian male musicians
21st-century Norwegian male musicians
Funky Butt (band) members